Samuel Andrew Cook (January 28, 1849April 4, 1918) was a U.S. Representative from Wisconsin.

Born in the British Province of Canada (in what is now the modern Canadian province of Ontario), Cook moved with his parents to Calumet County, Wisconsin, in 1855.
He attended the common schools in Fond du Lac and Calumet Counties.
Cook enlisted as a private in Company A, Second Wisconsin Cavalry, under General George A. Custer, and served until the end of the Civil War.
He lived on a farm in Calumet County until 1872, when he located in Marathon County and engaged in business.
He moved to Neenah, Wisconsin in 1881.

Cook was elected mayor of Neenah in 1889. He served as member of the Wisconsin State Assembly in 1891 and 1892. He served as delegate to the Republican National Convention in Minneapolis in 1892.

Cook was elected as a Republican to the Fifty-fourth Congress (March 4, 1895 – March 3, 1897).
He declined renomination in 1896.
He was an unsuccessful candidate for United States Senator in 1897 and again in 1907.
Commander of the Grand Army of the Republic for Department of Wisconsin in 1915 and 1916.
He became a manufacturer of print paper in Menasha, Wisconsin, while residing in Neenah, Wisconsin.
He served as president of the Alexandria Paper Company in Alexandria, Indiana.
He died in Neenah, Wisconsin, on April 4, 1918.
He was interred in Oak Hill Cemetery.

Sources

1849 births
1918 deaths
People of Wisconsin in the American Civil War
Mayors of places in Wisconsin
Republican Party members of the Wisconsin State Assembly
People from Calumet County, Wisconsin
Politicians from Neenah, Wisconsin
Union Army soldiers
Republican Party members of the United States House of Representatives from Wisconsin
19th-century American politicians
People from Marathon County, Wisconsin